Asad Majeed Khan is a Pakistani diplomat and Grade 22 officer. Dr. Asad Majeed Khan is a career Pakistan Foreign Service Officer.

Ambassador Dr. Asad Majeed Khan assumed charge as 31st Foreign Secretary of Pakistan on December 2, 2022.

During a diplomatic career spanning over 34 years, Ambassador Khan has held several key diplomatic assignments.

He served as Pakistan’s Ambassador to Japan (2017-19) and to the United States (2019-22). He was most recently Pakistan’s Ambassador to Belgium, Luxembourg and the European Union.

Ambassador Khan also served as Additional Foreign Secretary (Americas); Director General (Americas); Director General (West Asia); Pakistan’s Charge d’Affaires ad interim to the United States; Deputy Chief of Mission at the Embassy of Pakistan, Washington, D.C.; Additional Secretary (Foreign Affairs) at the President’s Secretariat; Director General (United Nations); and Minister-Counsellor at the Permanent Mission of Pakistan to the United Nations.

Ambassador Khan holds a Doctorate in International Economic and Business Law (LL.D.) from Kyushu University, Japan and has been a resource person at a number of academic institutions.

He is married and has two children.

References

Living people
Year of birth missing (living people)
Ambassadors of Pakistan to the United States
Ambassadors of Pakistan to Japan